Tamer Balcı (1 January 1917 – 10 April 1993) was a Turkish film actor.

Early life and education
He was born Toma Valcis in Istanbul, Turkey.

Career
A former Olympic athlete, Balcı appeared in fourteen films between 1951 and 1977, including as the title role in Tarzan in Istanbul (1952) (originally released as Tarzan İstanbul'da).

Filmography

References

External links

Database (undated).  "Tamer Balci".  sinemalar.com (in Turkish language).   Accessed 6 September 2010.
Database (undated).  "Tamer Balci".  theiapolis.com. Accessed 6 September 2010.

1917 births
20th-century Turkish male actors
1993 deaths
Male actors from Istanbul
Turkish male film actors
Olympic athletes of Turkey